Calgary West was a federal electoral district in Alberta, Canada, that was represented in the House of Commons of Canada from 1917 to 1953, and from 1979 to 2015. It was in the western part of the City of Calgary.

The electoral district was originally created in 1914 from Calgary riding. It was abolished in 1952 with parts being transferred to Calgary North, Calgary South, Bow River and Red Deer ridings. It was re-created in 1976 from Calgary North, Calgary South, Calgary Centre, and Palliser ridings. It was abolished during the 2012 Canadian federal electoral redistribution into Calgary Signal Hill (58%), Calgary Rocky Ridge (25%), and Calgary Confederation (17%).

From 1993 to 1997, Calgary West was represented by Stephen Harper, Prime Minister of Canada from 2006 to 2015. Harper represented the nearby riding of Calgary Southwest as leader of the Opposition (from 2002) and prime minister (from 2006).

Members of Parliament
This riding elected the following Members of Parliament:

Election results

1979–2015

1951 by-election

1949 general election

Note: Progressive Conservative vote is compared to "National Government" vote in 1940 election. Social Credit vote is compared to New Democracy vote in 1940 election.

1940 general election

Note: "National Government" vote is compared to Conservative vote in 1935 election. New Democracy vote is compared to Social Credit vote in 1935 election.

	

	

	
Note: Conservative vote is compared to Unionist vote in 1917 election.

See also
 List of Canadian federal electoral districts
 Past Canadian electoral districts

References

Notes

External links
 
 
 Expenditures – 2008
 Expenditures – 2004
 Expenditures – 2000
 Expenditures – 1997
 Elections Canada

Former federal electoral districts of Alberta
Politics of Calgary